Thälmann is a surname. Notable people with the surname include:

People 
 Ernst Thälmann (1886–1944), leader of the Communist Party of Germany (KPD) during much of the Weimar Republic
 Ernst Thälmann (film), East German film about the German Communist leader Ernst Thälmann
 Ernst Thälmann Island, 15 kilometre long and 500 metre wide Cuban island in the Gulf of Cazones
 Ernst Thälmann Pioneer Organisation, youth organisation of schoolchildren in East Germany
 Ernst-Thälmann-Park, park in the centre of the Prenzlauer Berg district in Berlin
 Thälmann Battalion, battalion of the International Brigades in the Spanish Civil War
 Ernst Thälmann Pioneer Organisation session (Pioniernachmittag)
  (1890–1962), wife of Ernst Thälmann

See also 
 Thalmann
 Thalman
 Talman (disambiguation)

German-language surnames